Bud Canada (June 6, 1925 – December 21, 2009) was an American politician who served in the Arkansas House of Representatives from 1959 to 1962 and in the Arkansas Senate from 1973 to 2001.

He died on December 21, 2009, in Hot Springs, Arkansas at age 84.

References

1925 births
2009 deaths
American football quarterbacks
Arkansas Razorbacks football players
Democratic Party members of the Arkansas House of Representatives
Democratic Party Arkansas state senators
20th-century American politicians